Chaâbane Merzekane (born 8 March 1959 in Hussein Dey, Algiers Province) is a former Algerian footballer, who played as a defender. He was a key member of the Algerian National Team that took part in the 1982 FIFA World Cup, playing the full 90 minutes in all three of the team's games.

Merzekane's first club was his neighborhood team, Onalait d'Hussein-Dey, where he played alongside Rabah Madjer. He spent most of his career playing for NA Hussein Dey and also had a brief stint with MC Alger. He also coached MO Béjaïa and USM El Harrach briefly after his retirement.

Individual 
 Africa Cup of Nations Team of the Tournament: 1982

References

1959 births
Living people
People from Hussein Dey (commune)
Algerian footballers
Algeria international footballers
Olympic footballers of Algeria
Footballers at the 1980 Summer Olympics
1982 FIFA World Cup players
1980 African Cup of Nations players
1982 African Cup of Nations players
1986 African Cup of Nations players
1988 African Cup of Nations players
NA Hussein Dey players
MC Alger players
Algeria youth international footballers
Association football defenders
Mediterranean Games bronze medalists for Algeria
Mediterranean Games medalists in football
Competitors at the 1979 Mediterranean Games
21st-century Algerian people